Hichem Rostom (26 May 1947 – 28 June 2022) was a Tunisian actor. He appeared in more than 70 films and television shows since 1987. He starred in Golden Horseshoes, which was screened in the Un Certain Regard section at the 1989 Cannes Film Festival. He also directed the Carthage Theatre Festival for two sessions.

Early life
Hichem Rostom was born in La Marsa, Tunisia, to a family of Circassian descent. In his youth, he studied at Sadiki College, Tunis, where he earned his Baccalaureate degree. He later moved to France to further his studies where he lived for years and graduated from Sorbonne University’s Institute of Theatre Studies and the Institute of Advanced Cinematographic Studies. He also worked as an animator at Radio France and then at the National Popular Theater before be returned to Tunisia in 1988 to pursue a professional career as an actor after being offered a role in the Tunisian drama film Golden Horseshoes in 1989, which he accepted.

Rostom showed a keen interest in acting at a young age because of his maternal grandfather, who used to take him to the Theater frequently. His acting talent was discovered by the Tunisian actor Ali Ben Ayed.

Career
In 2017, Hichem Rostom helped in organizing the Rouhaniyet Festival in Nefta, Tunisia, which is an event where spiritual and Sufi songs were performed.

Death
Rostom died on June 28, 2022, at the age of 75.

Filmography

References

External links

1947 births
2022 deaths
Tunisian male film actors
Tunisian male television actors
Tunisian male stage actors
20th-century Tunisian male actors
21st-century Tunisian male actors
Alumni of Sadiki College
Paris-Sorbonne University alumni
People from La Marsa
Tunisian people of Circassian descent